Dritt Mansion, named after its longest occupants, and also called Pleasant Garden, and current home to the Zimmerman Center for Heritage, is a historic home located at Lower Windsor Township, York County, Pennsylvania. It was built about 1758, and is a -story, fieldstone dwelling.  It measures 50 feet (15.2 m) long and 40 (12.2 m) feet wide, with a cedar-shingled gable roof.  The house has remained virtually unchanged since its construction.  The land the house is on was first granted by Lord Baltimore to Thomas Cresap in 1729, who operated a ferry here and claimed the area for Maryland. Cresap was arrested in 1736 and driven away after skirmishes known as "Cresap's War"—a dispute finally resolved in 1784 when the Mason–Dixon line was established. Today the home plays host to Heritage Area offices and programs and the Visions of the Susquehanna River Art Collection.

It was added to the National Register of Historic Places in 1977.

References

Houses on the National Register of Historic Places in Pennsylvania
Houses completed in 1758
Houses in York County, Pennsylvania
National Register of Historic Places in York County, Pennsylvania